El Barcelonazo was a military uprising in the Pedro María Freites barracks, located in the Venezuelan city of Barcelona, which occurred on 26 June 1961, against the government of President Rómulo Betancourt.

The soldiers took up the facilities of the Pedro María Freites Barracks and the Mariño Fusileros Battalion in the early morning hours, but they did not have the support of other components. The government regained control, and the movement was defeated. By 10 am, the main soldiers were arrested. The same day other movements rose up La Guaira and Ciudad Bolívar, but they failed, and their leaders were also arrested.

See also 
 El Carupanazo
 El Porteñazo

References 

Rebellions in Venezuela
1961 in Venezuela
Conflicts in 1961
Rómulo Betancourt
Barcelona, Venezuela